Francis Okello is a major general in Uganda People's Defence Force.

AMISOM
Major General Francis Okello was the second commander of AMISOM from 3 March 2008 to the end of his tour of duty in 2009, after which he returned to the army headquarter in Bombo, Uganda.

References

 

Ugandan military personnel
Living people
Year of birth missing (living people)
Ugandan generals